The Slovenian Women's Volleyball Cup is the top annual women's volleyball cup competition in Slovenia, organised by the Volleyball Federation of Slovenia. The first edition was played in the 1991–92 season. Nova KBM Branik is the most successful team with 19 titles.

List of finals

Titles by club

References

External links
  Official website  

Volleyball in Slovenia
Sports leagues established in 1991
1991 establishments in Slovenia